Eoophyla hemimelaena is a moth in the family Crambidae. It was described by George Hampson in 1917. It is found in the Philippines.

References

Eoophyla
Moths described in 1917